Al-Kahla District is a district of the Maysan Governorate, Iraq.

Districts of Maysan Province